The Department of Computer Science is the computer science department of the University of Oxford, England, which is part of the university's Mathematical, Physical and Life Sciences Division. It was founded in 1957 as the Computing Laboratory. By 2014 the staff count was 52 members of academic staff and over 80 research staff. The 2019, 2020 and 2021 Times World University Subject Rankings  places Oxford University 1st in the world for Computer Science. Oxford University is also the top university for computer science in the UK and Europe according to Business Insider. The 2020 QS University Subject Rankings places The University of Oxford 5th in the world (with the University of Cambridge placing 6th) for Computer Science.

Teaching
From its foundation the department taught undergraduates reading for mathematics and engineering degrees, but in 1985 the department's first undergraduate course was established, in 'Mathematics and Computation', followed in 1994 by the 'Computation' course. Initially these two courses had a common first year. 'Computer Science' replaced 'Computation' in the title of both courses for students starting their studies in 2000. Between 1987 and 2006 students started studies on a four-year (undergraduate) MEng in Engineering and Computing Science (now discontinued). In October 2012 the first students of the 'Computer Science and Philosophy' started. Today students on all three undergraduate courses - 'Computer Science', 'Maths & Computer Science' and 'Computer Science & Philosophy' - have the choice between a 3-year BA or a 4-year 'undergraduate masters'. Sixty students began one of the three undergraduate courses in October 2013.

There are two full-time taught postgraduate courses: the MSc in Computer Science (approx 50 students total) and the MSc in Mathematics and the Foundations of Computer Science (MFoCS) (approx 15 students total).

The department also offers the part-time Software Engineering Programme, a modular course for industry professionals, leading to either the MSc in Software Engineering (approx 240 students at present) or the M.Sc. in Software and Systems Security (approx 45 students at present).

Research
The department is home to around 145 academic and research staff.  The department's doctoral programme has over 140 research students (studying for a D.Phil. – the Oxford term for a PhD) working across a wide range of subjects in computer science and software engineering.

After fifty years within the department, the Numerical Analysis group moved in 2009 to be part of the university's Mathematical Institute. Today the department's research is classified into ten broad themes:

 Algorithms and Complexity Theory
 Artificial Intelligence and Machine Learning
 Automated Verification
 Computational Biology and Health Informatics
 Cyber Physical Systems
 Foundations, Structures, and Quantum
 Human-Centred Computing 
 Information Systems
 Programming Languages
 Security

Notable faculty
 the department employs 36 Professors.

 Nigel Shadbolt, Professor of Computing
 Samson Abramsky, Christopher Strachey Professor of Computing
 Tim Berners-Lee, Professor of Computer Science
 Richard Bird, Emeritus Professor
 Luca Cardelli, Royal Society Research Professor
 Bob Coecke, Professor of Quantum Foundations, Logics and Structures
 Nando de Freitas, Professor of Computer Science
 David Gavaghan, Professor of Computational Biology
 Jeremy Gibbons, Professor of Computing
 Leslie Ann Goldberg, Professor of Computer Science
 Georg Gottlob, Professor of Informatics
 Tony Hoare, Emeritus Professor
 Ian Horrocks, Professor of Computer Science
 Daniel Kroening, Professor of Computer Science
 Marta Kwiatkowska, Professor of Computing Systems
 Gavin Lowe, Professor of Computer Science
 Bill Roscoe, Professor of Computing Science
 Michael Wooldridge (computer scientist), Professor of Computer Science
 Marina Jirotka, Professor of Human Centred Computing

History
Starting in 1952, mathematician Charles Coulson sought funding for Oxford to own its own computer. At this time university members had to hire computer time from elsewhere. In 1956 the University Grants Committee decided to fund the purchase of a Ferranti Mercury and the Oxford University Computing Laboratory was born (shortened as OUCL or Comlab). As well as facilitating research elsewhere in the university, the new department had its own academic function, performing research in numerical analysis, and lecturing for mathematics and engineering students. The first director, Leslie Fox, was appointed in 1957 and the following year the department moved into its first home, 9 South Parks Road. In 1963 the department moved to 19 Parks Road. The Computing Services (From 2012 part of IT Services) was administratively split from the academic department in 1969, although complete independence was only gained in 1978.

Complementing the Numerical Analysis Group (NAG), the Programming Research Group (PRG) was set up in 1966 at 45 Banbury Road under the leadership of Christopher Strachey with the aim "to bring some coherence into the present ad hoc nature of programming and software". After Strachey's untimely death in 1975, Tony Hoare took over leadership of the PRG in 1977 until his retirement in 1999 and introduced a computer science undergraduate degree programme at Oxford. The NAG and PRG groups operated mostly separately until 1984, when both of the laboratory's research groups moved into 8–11 Keble Road, opposite Keble College. However the laboratory soon outgrew this space, and occupied space in 2 South Parks Road, until in 1993 the Wolfson Building opened behind the Victorian 8–11 Keble Road houses. The neighbouring houses at 5–7 Keble Road and a new "e-Science building" behind these provided additional space upon opening in 2007. However this space is not sufficient, and the department has additional space within the Thom Building and the Robert Hooke building. As of 2014, the department is hoping to obtain funding for a new building large enough to bring together all its activities.

From 2003 to 2014, the department was led by Bill Roscoe, who oversaw the 2011 renaming from the Oxford University Computing Laboratory to the Department of Computer Science, University of Oxford. The current head is Leslie Ann Goldberg.

See also
 Past and present members of the Department
 Oxford University Computing Services
 Programming Research Group

References

External links
 

1957 establishments in England
Educational institutions established in 1957
 
Computer Science
Oxford University, Department of Computer Science
Oxford University